The Renaissance Place is one of the first "new urbanist" mixed-use developments of its kind located in the Chicago suburb of Highland Park, Illinois.  It was designed in a vernacular style respectful of the history of this place.  It includes several different buildings and styles of architecture appropriate for each use. The project opened in late 2007, and was home to the third Saks Fifth Avenue location in Illinois until it closed in December 2012. Even though it is a new development, occupancy is almost 100%. Above street-level retailers are condominiums, offices and a fine arts movie theater served by underground parking, grade level parking and street parking. The development has been featured in the 2005 Urban Land Institute Handbook on Mixed Use Development;  the 2003 Urban Land Institute Handbook on Town Center Development;  and the 2002 Urban Land Institute Handbook on Place Making: Developing Town Centers, Main Streets and Urban Villages.  The facility was master planned and designed by the international architectural firm of Suttle Mindlin and has been a major factor in the revitalization of downtown Highland Park.

Current retailers
Renaissance Place Cinema
Ann Taylor
Chico's
Talbots
Pottery Barn
Williams Sonoma
Sunglass Hut International
Francesca's Collections
Restoration Hardware
Back in Comfort
L'Occitane en Provence
JoS. A. Bank Clothiers
Verizon Wireless

Former retailers
Saks Fifth Avenue (Closed December 2012)

Restaurants
Chipotle
Starbucks
Jamba Juice
Rosebud Restaurant

Offices
Smith Barney- Financial firm
Dick Blick- Seller of art supplies
Perlmutter Investment Co.- Real Estate investment company
International Airport Center LLC- Caters to air cargo shipments
Gold Realty- Local real-estate firm
Bank Leumi USA- Commercial bank

References

External links
 

Highland Park, Illinois
Shopping malls in Lake County, Illinois
Shopping malls established in 2007
2007 establishments in Illinois